GamersOrigin is a French professional esports club founded in March 2011 by Guillaume Merlini, based in Paris.

GamersOrigin has professional teams on League of Legends, Fortnite, Hearthstone, StarCraft, TrackMania, Street Fighter, Soulcalibur and Apex Legends.

History 
GamersOrigin was established in 2011 as a fansite of Diablo, but eventually became a gaming news and media website, and finally an esports club.

In 2017, GamersOrigin opened section of League of Legends with five players. This section quickly proved to be a success with good results on the French scene. Since 2017, GamersOrigin refocuses on esports by putting an end to its news site and web TV O'rigin in 2019.

Championships 
League of Legends teams

References

External links 

Esports in France
Esports teams based in France
Defunct and inactive Overwatch teams